De Troyer is a surname. Notable people with the surname include:

Kristin De Troyer (born 1963), Belgian professor and theological researcher
Tim De Troyer (born 1990), Belgian racing cyclist

See also
 Troyer